Asano Naritaka (November 7, 1817 – February 5, 1868) was a Japanese daimyō of the Edo period, who ruled Hiroshima Domain. His childhood name was Katsukichi (勝吉) later Nagataka (長粛).

Family
 Father: Asano Narikata
 Wife: Tokugawa Suehime (1817–1872), daughter of the 11th shōgun Tokugawa Ienari
 Children:
 Asano Yoshiteru
 Yakuhime (1843–1843) by Suehime

References 

1817 births
1868 deaths
Daimyo
Asano clan